Bear Branch is a stream in Pettis County in the U.S. state of Missouri. It is a tributary of the South Fork Blackwater River.

Bear Branch was so named on account of bears in the area.

See also
List of rivers of Missouri

References

Rivers of Pettis County, Missouri
Rivers of Missouri